The Muur van Mussert ("wall of Mussert") is all that remains of a rally ground with buildings and monuments planned by Anton Mussert and his National Socialist Movement in the Netherlands (NSB) to house party meetings and hold national events to celebrate national-socialist thought in the Netherlands. The wall was built in 1938, on a plot of land the NSB had acquired near Lunteren in Gelderland, in the center  of the country, and was inspired by the Nazi party rally grounds in Nuremberg.

Between 1936 and 1940, the NSB organized annual Hagespraken at the location, open-air propaganda meetings based on a supposed Germanic ideal and modeled after similar meetings in Germany. The place was visited by tens of thousands of NSB members, though the atmosphere was more that of a boy scout jamboree. One of the speakers at the (last) meeting on 22 June 1940 was Adriaan van Hees, who called for vengeance for the death of eight NSB members who had been executed during the German invasion of May 1940. After 1940, mass gatherings of a political kind were forbidden by the German occupying forces; after the war, the wall fell into disrepair.  the wall, overgrown in places, is little more than a boundary for a local campground; the masonry is crumbling and the associated buildings are ruined.

In the early 2000s, the municipality of Ede wanted to have the wall declared a monument but backtracked, after protests by war veterans and others (including the Centrum Informatie en Documentatie Israël (CIDI), an organization founded by the Dutch Jewish community), some of whom feared that the place would become a gathering point for the extreme right. In the 2010s, the wall again attracted attention in the media, prompted by the publication of De muur van Mussert (Boom, 2015) by Rene van Heijningen, a historian associated with the NIOD Institute for War, Holocaust and Genocide Studies.

References

External links

Netherlands in World War II
Ruins in the Netherlands
Buildings and structures in Ede, Netherlands